Mitkof Island is an island in the Alexander Archipelago in southeast Alaska between Kupreanof Island to the west and the Alaskan mainland to the east. Much of the island is managed as part of the Tongass National Forest.

The island is relatively flat with numerous muskegs. The highest point is Crystal Mountain .

The city of Petersburg is on the north end of the island. The total population of the island was 3,364 at the 2000 census, almost all of it in the city of Petersburg.

The island is surrounded by Frederick Sound to the north, Dry Strait to the east, Sumner Strait to the south, and Wrangell Narrows to the west. Bordered by Mitkof Island on one side, and Kuprenof and Woewodski Islands on the other, the Wrangell Narrows creates the only navigable 'Inside Passage' at this latitude and is one of the six Listed Narrows of Southeast Alaska.  Because of their shallow depths, the largest cruise ships do not pass through Wrangell Narrows or through Dry Strait. Spirit Creek is the southernmost stream on the island in the Wrangell Narrows, just two miles from where the narrows opens onto Sumner Strait.

The first European to sight the island was James Johnstone, one of George Vancouver's officers during his 1791-95 expedition, in 1793. The island is shown as separate from Kupreanof Island in an 1844 Russian chart, while the name was published in 1848 on a Russian Hydrographic Department chart as "Os(trov) Mitkova" for an Admiral Prokofy Mitkov.

References

 
Islands of Petersburg Borough, Alaska
Islands of the Alexander Archipelago
Tongass National Forest
Islands of Alaska